Chrudim District is a district (okres) within Pardubice Region of the Czech Republic. Its capital is the town of Chrudim.

Overview
The district has mostly flat terrain with slopes of Iron Mountains appearing on the south. Seč Dam is the largest water surface in the district (2.2 km2), Chrudimka is the longest river in the district (104 km). Industrial centres are Chrudim (mechanical engineering, textile, food industry), Hlinsko (electrotechnical, textile) and Skuteč (textile). Climatic conditions and terrain make the area convenient for agriculture.

Tourism is concentrated on Seč Dam and historical architecture. Of note is historical centre of Chrudim, hippology museum in Slatiňany, castles Košumberk, Lichnice, Rychmburk and Oheb, war memorial in Ležáky and Veselý Kopec Skansen.

Among notable persons associated with the district are inventor Josef Ressel, composers Zdeněk Fibich and Vítězslav Novák, writers Karel Václav Rais and Jaroslav Vrchlický, painters Antonín Slavíček, Antonin Chittussi and Adolf Kosárek.

List of municipalities
Chrudim -
Běstvina -
Biskupice -
Bítovany -
Bojanov - 
Bor u Skutče - 
Bořice -
Bousov - 
Bylany - 
Ctětín -
Čankovice -
České Lhotice -
Chrast - 
Chroustovice - 
Dědová -
Dolní Bezděkov -
Dřenice -
Dvakačovice -
Hamry -
Heřmanův Městec -
Hlinsko - 
Hluboká - 
Hodonín - 
Holetín - 
Honbice - 
Horka - 
Horní Bradlo - 
Hošťalovice -
Hrochův Týnec - 
Hroubovice - 
Jeníkov - 
Jenišovice -
Kameničky - 
Kladno -
Klešice -
Kněžice -
Kočí - 
Kostelec u Heřmanova Městce -
Krásné - 
Krouna - 
Křižanovice - 
Lány - 
Leštinka - 
Libkov - 
Liboměřice -
Licibořice -
Lipovec - 
Lozice - 
Lukavice - 
Luže -
Míčov-Sušice -
Miřetice - 
Mladoňovice - 
Morašice -
Mrákotín - 
Nabočany - 
Načešice - 
Nasavrky - 
Orel - 
Ostrov -  
Otradov - 
Perálec - 
Podhořany u Ronova - 
Pokřikov - 
Prachovice -  
Předhradí - 
Přestavlky - 
Proseč - 
Prosetín - 
Raná -
Rabštejnská Lhota - 
Řestoky -
Ronov nad Doubravou - 
Rosice - 
Rozhovice -  
Seč -
Skuteč - 
Slatiňany -  
Smrček - 
Sobětuchy - 
Stolany - 
Střemošice - 
Studnice - 
Svídnice - 
Svratouch - 
Tisovec - 
Třemošnice - 
Trhová Kamenice -
Třibřichy - 
Trojovice - 
Tuněchody - 
Úherčice -
Úhřetice - 
Vápenný Podol -
Včelákov - 
Vejvanovice - 
Vítanov - 
Vojtěchov - 
Vortová - 
Vrbatův Kostelec - 
Všeradov -
Vysočina -
Vyžice -
Zaječice - 
Zájezdec -
Zderaz -
Žlebské Chvalovice -
Žumberk

References

External links
Chrudim region - tourism, history, culture, photos, news, maps, real estates, discussion groups (in Czech)
List of municipalities of the Chrudim District

 
Districts of the Czech Republic